William Demmery (9 March 1877 – 1955) was an English footballer who played in the Football League for Bristol City.

References

1877 births
1955 deaths
English footballers
Association football goalkeepers
English Football League players
Warmley F.C. players
Bristol City F.C. players
Bristol Rovers F.C. players
Treharris Athletic Western F.C. players
Aberdare Town F.C. players
Mid Rhondda F.C. players